A parliamentary by-election was held in Bahrain on June 16, 2012, to elect a new member of the Council of Representatives for District 8 of the Muharraq Governorate. The seat was vacated after the previous incumbent Ghanim Al Buainain was appointed as the Minister of State for Foreign Affairs in April.

The winner of the elections was former Muharraq Municipal Councillor Sameer Kadhem, decided in a run-off vote held on June 23, 2012.  The turnout of the first round of voting was 37.2%, as a total of 3,029 votes were cast out of a total 8,128 registered voters.

References

Elections in Bahrain
2012 elections in Asia
2012 in Bahrain
2012 elections